John Drimmer is a writer and producer. He is also a practicing psychologist. He is the founder of Wisdomify.com, the wisdom-sharing website.

Early life, family and education
John Drimmer was born in New York City. He is the son of author and editor Frederick Drimmer.

He was educated at the University of Pennsylvania and Hamilton College, where he studied with writer-in-residence Alex Haley, author of Roots. He earned a Psy.D, a doctorate degree in psychology, from Ryokan College in 2003.

Career
Drimmer has worked as a journalist, director and writer of both fictional and documentary films as well as the executive producer of series for New York Times-Discovery, National Geographic, A&E and History Channel. He received an Emmy Award for creating the series Intervention. He has also won the Dupont-Columbia Award, the Writers Guild Foundation Award, the Telly Award, and the Aurora Award.

Drimmer started his career making non-fiction films for PBS, where he was the youngest person to ever win the DuPont-Columbia Award for his film Towers of Frustration, about life inside a high-rise ghetto in Newark, New Jersey. He then moved to the news series 60 Minutes where he was a producer.

He wrote the story for the feature film Iceman for Universal Studios, produced by Norman Jewison and directed by Fred Schepisi; Hero in the Family, which he wrote and produced for ABC/Disney; Battle in the Erogenous Zone, which he wrote, directed and produced for Showtime; and The Tear Collector, which he directed and wrote for Tales from the Darkside.

He later became the executive producer of many series for television.  He also ran the non-fiction TV division of Hearst Publishing and was executive producer at GRB Entertainment.

He splits his time between independent media projects and his private practice as a psychologist. He also teaches positive psychology to the medical students at the David Geffen School of Medicine at UCLA and founded the Positive Psychology Center of Los Angeles. He also hosts a podcast, The Wise Council Podcast.

Personal life
Drimmer is married. He and his wife, Barbara, reside in Santa Monica, California. They have a daughter, Zoee.

Filmography

As producer 
 1980 : 60 Minutes (TV series)
 1986 : Hero in the Family (TV)
 1992 : Battle in the Erogenous Zone (TV)
 1999 : War Dogs: America's Forgotten Heroes (TV)
 1999 : Medal of Honor (TV)
 2000 : Without Warning (TV series)
 2002 : Mysterious Worlds (TV series)
 2002 : Travel Scams & Rip-Offs Revealed (TV series)
 2004 : Forecast Earth
 2003 : Critical Condition - Stories of the ER"
 2003 : Coming Home (TV miniseries)
 2003 : The Last Mission (TV)
 2004 : Intervention (TV)
 2004 : Expeditions to the Edge (TV series)
 2004 : Shot from the Sky (TV)
 2005 : Untold Stories of the ER (TV series)
 2005 : History Hogs (TV)
 2006 : Guardian Angels, MD (TV series)

As screenwriter
 1984 : Iceman
 1986 : Hero in the Family (TV)
 1992 : Battle in the Erogenous Zone (TV)

As director 
 1984 : Tales from the Darkside (TV series)
 1992 : Battle in the Erogenous Zone (TV)

References

External links 
 

Living people
Year of birth missing (living people)
Television producers from New York (state)
University of Pennsylvania alumni
Hamilton College (New York) alumni